Todd A. Grinnell (born March 29, 1976) is an American actor, known for playing Jason in the series Four Kings and for playing building superintendent Schneider in the Netflix original sitcom One Day at a Time, based on the 1970s sitcom of the same name.

Personal life
On 29 August 2015, Grinnell married actress India de Beaufort. They have a son together, Crosby James (b. 2018).

Filmography

Film

Television

Web

References

External links
 
 

1976 births
21st-century American male actors
American male film actors
American male television actors
Living people
Male actors from Massachusetts
People from West Newbury, Massachusetts